The Donegal county football team represents Donegal in men's Gaelic football and is governed by Donegal GAA, the county board of the Gaelic Athletic Association. The team competes in the three major annual inter-county competitions; the All-Ireland Senior Football Championship, the Ulster Senior Football Championship and the National Football League.

Donegal's home ground is MacCumhaill Park, Ballybofey. The team's manager is Paddy Carr.

Donegal was the third Ulster county to win an All-Ireland Senior Football Championship (SFC), following Cavan and Down. The team last won the Ulster Senior Championship in 2019, the All-Ireland Senior Championship in 2012 and the National League in 2007.

The team is a major force in the sport. Currently regarded as one of the best teams in the sport, Karl Lacey won the 2012 All Stars Footballer of the Year, Michael Murphy won the 2009 All Stars Young Footballer of the Year and Ryan McHugh won the 2014 All Stars Young Footballer of the Year, while numerous other players have been selected on All Star teams. Donegal players comprised most of the 2012 All Stars Team of the Year, as well as all three nominations for Footballer of the Year, ultimately won by Lacey. In addition, having been invited to assist the Celtic soccer team in Scotland, Donegal manager Jim McGuinness became the first Gaelic football inter-county manager to have been offered a role at a professional sports team abroad. McGuinness's services have also been sought by Premier League soccer teams. In terms of style, "the system" deployed by McGuinness's team was likened to that of the Spanish association football team FC Barcelona.

Donegal are one of only five counties to have defeated Kerry in their first Championship meeting — the others being Down (1960), Derry (1958), Dublin (1893) and Cork (1889). Distances to games involving provincial opponents have been a problem.

History

Early years
Following the first Donegal County Board's formation in 1905, the county team's first football game was against Derry on 17 March 1906.

Donegal lost the 1933 "Home final" of the All-Ireland Junior Football Championship to Mayo (2–15 to 2–2) and then made their next appearance at Croke Park on Sunday 6 April 1952. The occasion was a National Football League semi-final and their opponents that day were Cork.

1960s
The sixties saw Donegal emerge as a footballing force with victories to match their undoubted abilities. Unfortunately they came into contact with a majestic Down machine that was also blistering the national stage with their prowess, becoming the first team from the North to win All Ireland senior championships in 1960, 1961 and 1968. Amazingly, Donegal's first appearance in an Ulster senior final was not until 1963, followed by a second appearance in 1966, On both occasions they were defeated by Down.

McEniff years 1970s–1980s: Ulster and Under-21 success
The county came to the fore of Ulster football in the 1970s, winning their first Ulster Senior Football Championship in 1972. McEniff was player-manager of the 1972 team. The win coincided with the county's first All Star—in the form of McEniff himself—in the second year of the award's existence. Reigning All-Ireland champions Offaly defeated the Ulster champions in the All-Ireland Senior Football Championship semi-final on the way to their second consecutive All-Ireland title.

A second provincial title followed for Donegal in 1974. McEniff was again player-manager. Galway, All-Ireland finalists in 1971 and 1973, defeated them in the All-Ireland Senior Football Championship semi-final.

In 1979, Donegal reached the Ulster Final again under the guidance of Sean O'Donnell, but were defeated by Monaghan.

In October 1982, Tom Conaghan managed Donegal to the All-Ireland Under-21 Football Championship.

McEniff returned as senior manager and Donegal won a third provincial title in 1983, with ten members of the 1982 under-21 team included in the panel. Seamus Bonner became the first player from the county to win the competition as a player on three occasions, having earlier won in 1972 and 1974. Again they were beaten by Galway in the All-Ireland Senior Football Championship semi-final, ahead of what would become a notorious 1983 All-Ireland Senior Football Championship Final, known as the "Game of Shame".

Tom Conaghan took over as senior manager from McEniff after McEniff departed again in the mid-1980s. Over the course of his time as senior manager during the 1980s, Conaghan fell out with players such as Declan Bonner, Manus Boyle, Matt Gallagher, Barry McGowan and Sylvester Maguire. Conaghan's spell as county manager ended with a heavy defeat to Tyrone.

In 1987, Donegal won the All-Ireland Under 21 Football Championship, a success which provided the basis for future prosperity in the county. They defeated Kerry in the final.

1990s: Sam Maguire Cup
McEniff returned as senior manager for a fourth time in September 1989. He led the county to another Ulster Senior Football Championship in 1990, restoring players that Conaghan had thrown by the wayside, such as Bonner, Boyle, Gallagher, McGowan and Maguire. Eventual All-Ireland Finalists Meath beat them in the 1990 All-Ireland Senior Football Championship semi-final.

However, Donegal would win the Ulster Senior Football Championship Final again in 1992. As a result of this victory an All-Ireland Senior Football Championship semi-final against Mayo beckoned. Donegal overcame the men from Mayo to set up a 1992 All-Ireland Senior Football Championship Final meeting with raging-hot favourites Dublin. Donegal's greatest footballing accomplishment yet was realised on 20 September 1992 when they defeated the highly fancied Dublin by a scoreline of 0–18 to 0–14 to take the Sam Maguire Cup for the first time. Brian McEniff, serving in his second spell as Donegal manager, pulled the strings. Man of the Match Manus Boyle scored 0–9 (four from play), while Gary Walsh pulled off a great save from Vinny Murphy at the end. This was the zenith of this great Donegal team who contested five successive Ulster Senior Football Championship Finals between 1989 and 1993. The Donegal team of this era also contested the final of the National Football League three times in a four-year period (1993 v. Dublin, 1995 v. Derry, 1996 v. Derry) without success. McEniff soon stood down as manager.

Martin McHugh wanted to take charge of Donegal after McEniff left the job. However, he was prevented from doing so by the Donegal County Board in a snub that would be echoed in Jim McGuinness's numerous later attempts to get the same job—McGuinness was, however, ultimately successful; after being rejected by the Donegal County Board on several occasions he would go on to be Donegal's most successful manager since McEniff. McHugh was hurt by his rejection, saying: "I thought there was another All-Ireland in Donegal and that's why I went for that job. I thought there was another All-Ireland there, and there was a lot of good players coming too. But anyway, that's the way it worked out".

Declan Bonner (first term): 1997–2000
Declan Bonner managed the team between 1997 and 2000. He began on his 32nd birthday, within four weeks of retirement. He was informed of the decision to appoint him at 9.29 pm on 11 August 1997, after Anthony Molloy, past manager Conaghan and Pauric McShea all withdrew. Charlie Mulgrew and Matt Gallagher were part of Bonner's management team. Bonner led Donegal to the 1997–98 National Football League semi-final against eventual title winners Offaly and the 1998 Ulster SFC final against Derry — a last-minute Joe Brolly goal, accompanied by a few kisses to the crowd, put paid to that one.

John Joe and the Derrymen: 2000–2010
Mickey Moran was appointed manager on a three-year term in August 2000, succeeding Declan Bonner. Moran's first game in charge was a league victory at home to Offaly, a win achieved while fielding four debutants (Stephen Cassidy, Michael Doherty, Barry Monaghan and ... one other?). During his tenure selector Michael Houston quit after a public falling out with Moran. Moran's first year in charge of Donegal was a disappointing one, but 2002 was more successful, leading Donegal to the Ulster final (where they were beat by Armagh) and then to the All-Ireland quarter-final against Dublin. However, in September 2002 he informed the county board he would not be staying for the third year of the term. All-Ireland winning manager Brian McEniff took the reins for the 2003 season. His first game back in charge, an away league fixture to Galway in Tuam in February 2003, ended in defeat. However, McEniff guided Donegal to the All-Ireland semi-final for the first time since 1992. The following year they reached another Ulster final, again losing out to Armagh. McEniff stepped down after the 2005 season to end his fourth and final tenure with the county.

Brian McIver was appointed manager in 2006. His tenure saw a slight improvement in the fortunes of the team as he led them into Division 1 of the National Football League. However, the county had been without a trophy for 15 years. They had contested the 1993 and 1998 Ulster Senior Football Championship Finals, but lost to Derry on both occasions. Defeat to Armagh in the same contest in 2002, 2004 and 2006 meant another decade passed without a Championship trophy. They contested the 2006 Division 2 Final, but lost to Louth. The famine came to an abrupt end in 2007 when the senior football team won the National Football League title for the first time in the county's history. Donegal overcame Mayo at Croke Park on Sunday 22 April 2007 with a score line of 0–13 to 0–10. On-route to the final Donegal defeated Cork, Mayo, Tyrone, Dublin, Kerry, Fermanagh and Kildare while drawing with Limerick.

McIver stood down as manager after the 2007 Championship; however, he was reinstated before the beginning of the 2008 Championship. In 2008, at a County Board meeting, a motion of no confidence was tabled by the St Eunan's and Gaoth Dobhair clubs; as a result McIver felt compelled to resign. Declan Bonner and Charlie Mulgrew were appointed "Joint Managers" when John Joe Doherty of the Naomh Columba club was said to have rejected the opportunity to become manager. However, Doherty entered negotiations before Bonner and Mulgrew were rubber stamped. He was later offered the job for a second time, which he accepted. Bonner and Mulgrew had contested that the procedure which led to the installing of John Joe Doherty as football manager in the county was flawed. The duo's case was heard November 2008 but had taken 13 days of deliberation for the DRA to reach a verdict. John Joe Doherty was appointed manager at the November county board meeting. Bonner, Mulgrew and Doherty had been joined by Michael Houston, Francie Martin and Jim McGuinness on the shortlist to become manager.

McGuinness years: 2010–2014

In July 2010, Jim McGuinness, the then under-21 manager, was appointed as county senior manager, succeeding John Joe Doherty. McGuinness guided the county's under-21 side to the All-Ireland Under 21 Football Championship final in 2010. He was appointed to the senior management on a four-year term, with a review after two years. His first year in charge brought Donegal the National Football League Division 2 title, promotion to Division 1, the county's first championship win in four years, the county's first provincial title in 19 years, and made Donegal the third team in the history of the GAA to win a provincial title from the preliminary round. His second season brought a second consecutive provincial title, also achieved from the preliminary round, as well as a defeat of Kerry at Croke Park and a win over Cork on 26 August to secure a place in the 2012 All Ireland Football Final.

In 2010, after a disappointing Championship, in which Donegal lost at home to Down after extra-time, and to Armagh in Crossmaglen by nine points in the first round of the All-Ireland Qualifiers, John Joe Doherty resigned from his post as senior football manager. The only candidate to replace him was Jim McGuinness. Upon his appointment on 26 July 2010, McGuinness brought Kevin Cassidy and Michael Hegarty out of retirement, introduced many players from the U-21 side he had taken to the 2010 All-Ireland Under 21 Football Championship Final, and introduced structure and discipline, a feature that many observers claimed was lacking in many talented Donegal teams between 1993 and 2011.

McGuinness's first major success as senior manager was to win the National Football League Division 2 when they beat Laois in Croke Park by 2–11 to 0–16 points. They went through the league season unbeaten, except for the last league match proper, when they lost to Laois. Before the Division 2 Final, they had topped the Division 2 league and were guaranteed promotion with four wins, two draws, and one loss.

After this victory, expectations for the county were high, with many pundits predicting that Donegal would win the Ulster Championship. Donegal beat Antrim 1–10 to 0–07 in the preliminary round. This was the team's first Championship win since 2007. This set up an away match against Cavan from which Donegal once again emerged victorious, by a scoreline of 2–14 to 1–08. A more ominous test against Tyrone would follow this Cavan victory. The new defensive system developed by Jim McGuinness would be put to the test against a Tyrone team which perfected the blanket defense tactic on the way to three All Ireland victories in the 2000s. Donegal fought their way to a 2–06 to a 0–09 win.

This set up an Ulster Final meeting against a heavily fancied Derry, which one week prior to Donegal's victory over Tyrone, put 3–14 past an Armagh team which had just overcome Down, the 2010 All-Ireland Senior Football Championship runners-up.

On 17 July 2011, in Clones, Donegal played in their first Ulster final in five years and their sixth Ulster Final since 1992. In front of a crowd of 28,364 Donegal beat Derry by 1–11 to 0–08 points. This was only the third time in the history of the Ulster Senior Football Championship that a team which played the preliminary round would win the Final, following in the footsteps of Armagh in 2005 and Cavan 66 years earlier. On 30 July 2011, Donegal travelled to Croke Park to play Kildare in the All-Ireland quarter-final. In an absorbing contest, a Kevin Cassidy point deep into extra time sealed Donegal's progression to their first All Ireland semi-final since 2003. The semi-final against Dublin, which Dublin eventually won 0–8 to 0–6, was to be regarded as one of the lowest scoring but most absorbing Championship duels in living memory.

On 22 July 2012, Donegal retained the Ulster title for the first time in their history with a 2–18 to 0–13 victory over Down. On 5 August 2012, they defeated Kerry. The first ever Championship meeting between the sides at senior level, it was only the second time in history that Kerry had been defeated at the quarter final stage. Ahead of their next match against Cork, few outside the county gave Donegal a chance, and Cork went into the game as heavy favourites to win the title itself (even though this was only the semi-final). Donegal endeavoured to swat aside a lacklustre Cork side with ease and progressed to their first title decider since 1992. Tyrone's Mickey Harte, attempting to analyse the game for the BBC, expressed his shock: "To be honest, I could not see that coming. Donegal annihilated Cork, there is no other word for it." Martin McHugh, a member of the successful 1992 side, said it was the best ever performance by any Donegal team including his own. Donegal emerged victorious from the 2012 All-Ireland Senior Football Championship Final on 23 September 2012 to take the Sam Maguire Cup for the second time, with early goals from Michael Murphy and Colm McFadden. They defeated Mayo, on a scoreline of 2–11 to 0–13. Man of the Match was awarded to Michael Murphy, who scored 1–04.

The 2013 season brought great expectation with Donegal as reigning All-Ireland champions. However, they suffered relegation from Division 1 of the National Football League early in the year. In the Ulster Championship they dispatched Tyrone and Down to set up a provincial decider with Monaghan. Monaghan were unfancied coming into the game with most of the pressure on the shoulders of the Tir Conaill men. Despite this Monaghan defied the odds and emerged as 0–13 to 0–07 winners. After defeating Laois in the fourth round of the qualifiers Donegal faced a Mayo team looking for revenge in the All-Ireland quarter-final. They got their revenge with a 4–17 to 1–10 drubbing that ended Donegal's bid to retain the Sam Maguire.

2014 saw a resurgent Donegal claim promotion from Division 2 of the National League alongside Monaghan. They overcame Derry in a tense quarter final and Antrim in the semi-final to set up another Ulster final clash with Monaghan. This time Donegal came out on top by three points to reclaim the Ulster title. A meeting with Armagh beckoned in the All-Ireland quarter-final. An Odhran MacNiallais goal proved crucial in a 1–12 to 1–11 win. This set up a daunting semi-final clash with 2013 champions Dublin. At the time Dublin were seen by many as unstoppable and were heavy favourites for the clash with Donegal. Bookmakers had Donegal as low as 7/1 to win the game. However, after surviving a first half onslaught a Ryan McHugh goal gave Donegal the lead at half time. In the second half Donegal swept Dublin aside running out six-point winners, with McHugh and Colm McFadden to the fore. Kerry were the opponents in the final, and despite Kerry's traditional dominance Donegal went into the game as favourites after their semi-final defeat of Dublin. Again Kerry upset the form books to claim a 2–09 to 0–12 win and their 37th All-Ireland title. Jim McGuinness stepped down in the aftermath of the game, after leading his county to three Ulster titles and one All-Ireland.

Bonner–McGuinness interim: 2014–2017
McGuinness's former assistant Rory Gallagher took over for the 2015 campaign, and the year began brightly with Donegal reaching the National League semi-final, losing out to Cork. Starting in the preliminary round of the Ulster Championship, Donegal defeated Tyrone, Armagh and Derry to set up a third successive Ulster final with now bitter rivals Monaghan. After winning tough games against Tyrone and Derry, Donegal were seen as slight favourites going into the game. However, Monaghan prevailed by a single point to consign Donegal to the qualifiers. Galway awaited them there but Donegal won by a scoreline of 3–12 to 0–11 in an improved performance. Mayo were the opponents in the quarter-finals and Donegal went in as underdogs. So it proved as Mayo won by a comfortable seven-point margin to end Donegal's hopes for another year.

2016 began with Donegal looking to reclaim the Ulster title and make a serious assault on the All-Ireland. They again reached the semi-final of the National League, this time being defeated by Dublin. Their Ulster Championship began with a tricky encounter against Fermanagh at MacCumhaill Park where they eventually won by four points after going down to 14 men. They faced familiar foes Monaghan in the semi-final. After two intense games of football Donegal won out to advance to their sixth successive Ulster final, a feat only matched by the great Down side of the 1960s. They were up against Mickey Harte's Tyrone who were appearing in their first final since 2010. Two injury time points handed Tyrone their first provincial title since 2010 and again Donegal were heading for the qualifiers. However, Donegal continued their recent good form in the qualifiers with a three-point victory over Cork, with Patrick McBrearty achieving an individual haul of 0–11. Leinster and All-Ireland champions Dublin were the opponents in the All-Ireland quarter-final. Dublin avenged their defeat in 2014 semi-final by winning 1–15 to 1–10 in a close contest. They required a late Paul Mannion goal to kill off the game and Donegal's Championship aspirations for 2016.

A 2017 Ulster Senior Football Championship semi-final capitulation to Tyrone and 2017 All-Ireland Senior Football Championship exit to Galway at Markievicz Park and Gallagher was gone.

Declan Bonner (second term): 2017–2022
Five contenders for the senior manager emerged: minor manager Shaun Paul Barrett, Declan Bonner, Cathal Corey, Gary McDaid and Séamus McEnaney. Bonner was announced as manager on 22 September 2017, taking charge for the second time.

They won the 2018 Ulster Senior Football Championship. Senior players Jason McGee and Niall O'Donnell were not part of this as they decided to drop down to play with the under-20 team instead between league and championship.

They won the 2019 Ulster Senior Football Championship.

Bonner was reappointed for another two-year term as manager at the end of August 2021 when no other candidates emerged to succeed him.

He left the role in mid-2022.

Seasons

Captains

Current management team
Confirmed in October 2022:
Manager: Paddy Carr

Head coach: Aidan O'Rourke
Selectors: 
 
Paddy Bradley, announced November 2022

Current panel

INJ Player has had an injury which has affected recent involvement with the county team.
RET Player has since retired from the county team.
WD Player has since withdrawn from the county team due to a non-injury issue.

Recent call-ups
The following players have also been called up to the Donegal panel during the previous three seasons, or in the 2018 Championship.

Supporters
The team has an official supporters' club called, simply, Donegal GAA Supporters' Club. The chairperson is Father Brian Quinn, the secretary is Catriona McCaffrey and the joint treasurers are Grace Boyle and Brendan Brady. It existed from the early 1990s until 2006 before being resurrected following the winning 2012 All-Ireland SFC campaign. The aim of the club is to provide financial assistance to the team.

Daniel O'Donnell has performed fundraising concerts for the team. He and his wife Majella are regular spectators at games. O'Donnell was at Croke Park for the 1992 All-Ireland SFC final and sang a duet with manager Jim McGuinness at the 2012 All-Ireland SFC homecoming in Donegal Town. Former Ireland international goalkeeper Shay Given is a supporter and has helped trained the team. Séamus Coleman is another prominent supporter who has attended games. The "banana bunch" were noted for bringing inflatable bananas to games in the early 1990s. Christy Murray and his bagpipes have featured in the approach to and aftermath of games for several decades.

Colours and crest
Donegal play since their foundation in green and gold kits, which are also the colours of the board's logo and of the county crest because they recall the gold of the sandy beaches of the county and the green of the well known Hills of Donegal. Despite the colours have been always the same during the years, their disposal has been very different for much of the team's history. The classic Donegal kit was indeed composed by a green shirt with a golden hoop, white shorts and green and gold socks (identical to Kerry). In 1966 the board opted for golden shirts but they turned green after only a short period, in the 1980s also often with green shorts. In 1992, when they reached the semifinal against Mayo, they had to use a change kit which was a gold shirt with green sleeves and green shorts. Due to the unexpected victory against the favorite Connacht side, they decided to retain this colour combination for the final against Dublin. Donegal won their first All-Ireland title and since then they have favoured a yellow/gold shirt and green shorts.

Usually Donegal wore as change kit gold shirts with green trim, or gold shirts with black trim (recalling Ulster GAA colours). Since they switched to gold as their primary colour, change kits have been green or white.

Ahead of the 2022 season, a new kit was launched, featuring a "shadow print" naming each of the county's clubs.

Kit evolution

Team sponsorship
The following companies have sponsored Donegal.

Evolve Clothing has supplied the team with casual and formal attire on All-Ireland and Ulster final days.

Managerial history
Some of those asked if they were interested in succeeding Declan Bonner as manager in 2022 cited social media abuse as a reason for their lack of interest.

Players

Notable players

Records

Oldest players in an All-Ireland SFC final
The following were aged 30 or over when playing in an All-Ireland SFC final.Where a player has appeared in more than one final the latest is referenced.

Neil Gallagher 31/32? 2014
Rory Kavanagh 31/32? 2014
Colm McFadden 31/32? 2014
Christy Toye 31 2014

Martin McHugh 30 1992
Paul Durcan 30 2014
Eamon McGee 30 2014
Anthony Molloy 30 1992
Karl Lacey 30 2014
Donal Reid  30 1992

Youngest players in an All-Ireland SFC final
The following were aged 24 or under when playing in an All-Ireland SFC final.Where a player has appeared in more than one final the first is referenced.

Darach O'Connor 18 2014
Patrick McBrearty 19 2012
Ryan McHugh 20 2014
Dermot Molloy 20/21 2012 
Tony Boyle 22 1992
Odhrán Mac Niallais 22 2014
Mark McHugh 22 2012
Michael Murphy 23 2012
Paddy McGrath 23 2012
Leo McLoone 22/23? 2012
Martin McElhinney 24 2012

Most appearances

As of 1 May 2020. Neil McGee's total is from 2022, when he retired.

The following are among those to have made the highest number of appearances for the senior team:

Top scorers
Updated 14 August 2018.

All Stars

Player of the Year

Honours
Official honours, with additions noted.

National

All-Ireland Senior Football Championship
 Winners (2): 1992, 2012
 Runners-up (1): 2014
National Football League
 Winners (1): 2007
 Runners-up (3): 1992–93, 1994–95, 1995–96
National Football League Division 2
 Winners (2): 2011, 2019
All-Ireland Under 21 Football Championship
 Winners (2): 1982, 1987
All-Ireland Minor Football Championship
 Runners-up (1): 2014
All-Ireland Vocational Schools Championship
 Winners (6): 1984, 1985, 1995, 1996, 2002, 2011
RTÉ Team of the Year Award
 Winners (1): 2012

Provincial
Ulster Senior Football Championship 
 Winners (10): 1972, 1974, 1983, 1990, 1992, 2011, 2012, 2014, 2018, 2019
Ulster Junior Football Championship
 Winners (5): 1930, 1933, 1939, 1952, 1954
Ulster Under-21 Football Championship
 Winners (8): 1963, 1964, 1966, 1982, 1987, 1995, 2010,  2017
Ulster Minor Football Championship
 Winners (7): 1956, 1985, 1991, 1996, 2006, 2014, 2016
Ulster Vocational Schools Football Championship
 Winners (15): 1964, 1965, 1984, 1985, 1986, 1987, 1992, 1994, 1995, 1996, 2002, 2010, 2011, 2012, 2013
Dr McKenna Cup
 Winners (11): 1963, 1965, 1967, 1975, 1985, 1991, 2001, 2002, 2009, 2010, 2018
Dr Lagan Cup
 Winners (4): 1952, 1965, 1966, 1967

References

External links
 
 Cláracha na gCluichí/Programmes — access many hundreds from the 1950s to 2020, as reported here

 
County football teams